Sudith is an unincorporated community in Menifee County, Kentucky, United States.  It lies along Route 36 north of the city of Frenchburg, the county seat of Menifee County.  Its elevation is 751 feet (229 m).

Sudith is part of the Mount Sterling Micropolitan Statistical Area.

References

Unincorporated communities in Menifee County, Kentucky
Unincorporated communities in Kentucky
Mount Sterling, Kentucky micropolitan area